Frequency refers to how often an event occurs within a given period.

Frequency may also refer to:

Entertainment
 Frequency (2000 film), a film starring Jim Caviezel and Dennis Quaid
Frequency (2019 film), a Burmese horror film
 Frequency (TV series), a 2016 TV series starring Peyton List and Riley Smith
 Frequency (Nick Gilder album), 1979
 Frequency (Frequency album), 2006
 Frequency (IQ album), 2009
 "Frequency" (song), a 2016 song by Kid Cudi from Passion, Pain & Demon Slayin
 "Frequency", a song by Feeder from their 2005 album Pushing the Senses
 "Frequency", a song by The Jesus and Mary Chain from Honey's Dead
 "Frequency", a 1991 song by Altern-8 also featured on the album Full On... Mask Hysteria
 "Frequency", a song by Super Furry Animals from their album Love Kraft
 Frequency (record producer) (born 1983), American music producer and musician
 Frequency (video game), a 2001 music video game
 Frequencies (album)  by LFO, 1991

Other
 Frequency (gene), a specific gene named "frequency"
 Frequency (statistics), the number of occurrences of an event
 FM4 Frequency Festival, an Austrian music festival

See also
 Aperiodic frequency
 Periodicity (disambiguation)
 Rate (disambiguation)
 Rate of change (disambiguation)
 Quefrency